Johntown is an extinct town in Dawson County, in the U.S. state of Georgia.

History
A post office called Johntown was established in 1879, and remained in operation until 1944. The community was named after John S. Holden, an early postmaster.

References

Geography of Dawson County, Georgia
Ghost towns in Georgia (U.S. state)